The 2001 Tour du Haut Var was the 33rd edition of the Tour du Haut Var cycle race and was held on 24 February 2001. The race started and finished in Draguignan. The race was won by Daniele Nardello.

General classification

References

2001
2001 in road cycling
2001 in French sport
February 2001 sports events in France